The Kirishi-2 Oil Refinery will be Russia's first residual oil high conversion refinery to be opened in Kirishi, Russia in 2017.

The Kirishi-2 Oil Refinery will produce a high yield of light oil (73.12%) and high-quality motor fuels. Its products will include AI-95 motor gasoline, gas petrochemicals, diesel, kerosene, LPG appliances, isobutene, N-butane, petroleum coke, propane and sulphur.

The refinery project is managed by Giorgi Ramzaitsev, the chairman of the Board of Directors of ChekSU, a major manganese ore and ferroalloy mining and processing company in Russia, and Andrei Yermolaev, a former member of the Leningrad Regional Legislative Assembly.

The Kirishi-2 Oil Refinery will have an annual output of 10 million tons.

References

External links

Official site

Oil refineries in Russia
Oil companies of Russia
Petrochemical companies
Companies based in Leningrad Oblast